Oliver Edward Westbury (born 2 July 1997) is an English cricketer. He made his List A debut for Worcestershire against the West Indies A in a tri-series warm-up match on 19 June 2018. He made his Twenty20 debut for Worcestershire in the 2018 t20 Blast on 10 August 2018. He made his first-class debut for Worcestershire in the 2018 County Championship on 10 September 2018. Since his release by Worcestershire he has become a sports reporter for the Shropshire star.

References

External links
 

1997 births
Living people
People from Dudley
English cricketers
Shropshire cricketers
Worcestershire cricketers
People educated at Shrewsbury School